CER model 22 was an early digital computer developed by Mihajlo Pupin Institute in Yugoslavia in the 1960s.

CER-2 was a prototype computer model (in 1963) only, for the early digital computers CER-20 or CER-22.

See also
 CER Computers
 Mihajlo Pupin Institute

CER computers
Mihajlo Pupin Institute